Leandro Sebastián Zárate (born 31 March 1984 in Córdoba) is an Argentine professional footballer who plays as a forward for Gimnasia y Tiro.

Career
Zárate has played in Argentina for Talleres de Córdoba, Racing de Córdoba, CS Ben Hur, Argentinos Juniors, Defensa y Justicia, Atlético Tucumán and Unión de Santa Fe, and in Brazil for Botafogo

External links
 
 Argentine Primera statistics 

1984 births
Living people
Argentine footballers
Argentine expatriate footballers
Talleres de Córdoba footballers
Racing de Córdoba footballers
Argentinos Juniors footballers
Defensa y Justicia footballers
Atlético Tucumán footballers
Unión de Santa Fe footballers
Botafogo de Futebol e Regatas players
Instituto footballers
Argentine Primera División players
Primera Nacional players
Expatriate footballers in Brazil
Argentine expatriate sportspeople in Brazil
Association football forwards
Footballers from Córdoba, Argentina